Magdeburg-Eichenweiler station is a railway station in the Eichenweiler district of Magdeburg, capital city of Saxony-Anhalt, Germany.

Notable places nearby
Magdeburg Zoo
Neustädter See

References

Eichenweiler